Face fungus may refer to:

A beard
A fungal infection of the face